Amir Coffey (born June 17, 1997) is an American professional basketball player for the Los Angeles Clippers of the National Basketball Association (NBA). He played college basketball for the Minnesota Golden Gophers.

High school career
Attending Hopkins High School in Minnetonka, Minnesota, Coffey received Minnesota Mr. Basketball honors as a senior, while earning Associated Press State Player of the Year and Star Tribune Metro Player of the Year distinction. He averaged 19.9 points during his senior season (2015–16). A four-star recruit and ranked 32nd overall in ESPN’s top 100 for the class of 2016, Coffey announced his decision to play college basketball at Minnesota in September 2015. He scored seven points to go along with two assists and two rebounds at the 2016 Jordan Brand Classic.

College career
He had an immediate impact on the Golden Gophers, finishing his freshman year as the team’s second-leading scorer (12.2ppg) and second-leading assist man at 3.1 per game, earning Big Ten Conference All-Freshman Team honors. In his junior season, he was named by coaches and media to the All-Big Ten 3rd Team.

Professional career

Los Angeles Clippers (2019–present)
After going undrafted in the 2019 NBA draft, Coffey signed a two-way contract with the Los Angeles Clippers. On August 14, 2020, he scored a season-high 21 points, along with four steals, in a 107–103 overtime win over the Oklahoma City Thunder.

On February 15, 2021, Coffey scored a season-high 15 points in a 125–118 win over the Miami Heat.

On September 27, 2021, Coffey signed another two-way contract with the Clippers. On March 26, 2022, his deal was converted to a standard contract. On April 1, he logged a then career-high 32 points, alongside seven assists and four steals, in a 153–119 blowout win over the Milwaukee Bucks. On April 10, Coffey scored a career-high 35 points in a 138-88 win against the Thunder.

On July 6, 2022, Coffey re-signed with the Clippers on a three-year, $11 million deal.

Career statistics

NBA

Regular season

|-
| style="text-align:left;"| 
| style="text-align:left;"| L.A. Clippers
| 18 || 1 || 8.8 || .426 || .316 || .545 || .9 || .8 || .3 || .1 || 3.2
|-
| style="text-align:left;"| 
| style="text-align:left;"| L.A. Clippers
| 44 || 1 || 9.0 || .437 || .411 || .711 || 1.0 || .5 || .2 || .0 || 3.2 
|-
| style="text-align:left;"| 
| style="text-align:left;"| L.A. Clippers
| 69 || 30 || 22.7 || .453 || .378 || .863 || 2.9 || 1.8 || .6 || .2 || 9.0
|- class="sortbottom"
| style="text-align:center;" colspan="2"| Career
| 131 || 32 || 16.2 || .448 || .380 || .807 || 2.0 || 1.2 || .4 || .1 || 6.2

Playoffs

|-
| style="text-align:left;"| 2020
| style="text-align:left;"| L.A. Clippers
| 3 || 0 || 2.3 || .000 || .000 || 1.000 || .0 || 1.3 || .3 || .0 || .7
|-
| style="text-align:left;"| 2021
| style="text-align:left;"| L.A. Clippers
| 10 || 0 || 1.6 || .750 || 1.000 || .000 || .2 || .1 || .1 || .0 || .7
|- class="sortbottom"
| style="text-align:center;" colspan="2"|Career
| 13 || 0 || 1.8 || .429 || .500 || .667 || .2 || .4 || .2 || .0 || .7

College

|-
| style="text-align:left;"| 2016–17
| style="text-align:left;"| Minnesota
|| 33 || 33 || 33.2 || .449 || .337 || .753 || 3.8 || 3.1 || 1.1 || .2 || 12.2
|-
| style="text-align:left;"| 2017–18 
| style="text-align:left;"| Minnesota
|| 18 || 18 || 31.6 || .475 || .368 || .687 || 4.1 || 3.3 || .7 || .3 || 14.0
|-
| style="text-align:left;"| 2018–19 
| style="text-align:left;"| Minnesota 
|| 36 || 36 || 35.2 || .436 || .304 || .740 || 3.6 || 3.2 || .9 || .2 || 16.6
|- class="sortbottom"
| style="text-align:center;" colspan="2"| Career
|| 87 || 87 || 33.7 || .448 || .328 || .734 || 3.8 || 3.2 || .9 || .2 || 14.4

Personal life
His father Richard Coffey played college basketball at Minnesota, followed by a professional career in the NBA (52 games for the Minnesota Timberwolves in 1990–91), the CBA, Turkey and Spain.

His sister, Nia Coffey, played basketball at Northwestern University. She went fifth overall in the 2017 WNBA draft to the San Antonio Stars.

References

External links
 Minnesota Golden Gophers bio

1997 births
Living people
Agua Caliente Clippers players
American men's basketball players
Basketball players from Minnesota
Hopkins High School alumni
Los Angeles Clippers players
Minnesota Golden Gophers men's basketball players
People from Hopkins, Minnesota
Shooting guards
Sportspeople from the Minneapolis–Saint Paul metropolitan area
Undrafted National Basketball Association players